BHD may refer to:

 Bahraini dinar, the ISO 4217 code for the currency of Bahrain
 Black Hawk Down (book), a 1999 book by Mark Bowden 
 Black Hawk Down (film), a 2001 film adaptation of the book
 Delta Force: Black Hawk Down, a 2003 action game based on the events in Somalia 
 George Best Belfast City Airport, the IATA airport code
 Bulkhead (disambiguation)
 Bhd., Berhad, a Malaysian public limited company
 Birt–Hogg–Dubé syndrome, a genetic disorder